Senecio adenotrichius is a species of the genus Senecio. It is native to Chile, and common on disturbed land there.

It is an invasive plant species in the United States.

References

External links

adenotrichius
Flora of Chile